The 2009 Toulon Tournament was the 37th edition of the Toulon Tournament, and was held from 3 June to 12 June 2009. The tournament concluded with the final between France and Chile at Stade Mayol in Toulon as Chile won their first title after the final score of 1–0, scored by Gerson Martínez on 73rd minute.

Participant teams 

 

 

 (host)

Venues 
The matches are being played in these communes:
Aubagne
Bormes
La Seyne
Saint-Cyr-sur-Mer
Toulon

Squads

Results

Group A

Standings

Fixtures

Group B

Standings

Fixtures

Semi-finals

Third-place playoff

Final

Winners

Goal scorers 
4 goals

 Diego Buonanotte
 Gerson Martínez

3 goals

 Fábio Coentrão
 Eduardo Vargas

2 goals

 Éver Banega
 Yazalde
 Ricky van Wolfswinkel

1 goal

 Alejandro Gómez
 Franco Jara
 Diego Perotti
 Mohamed Fawzi Abdalla
 Bakary Sako
 Marzouk Salah
 Islam Ramadan
 Younousse Sankharé
 Donovan Deekman
 Afroto
 Lucas Trecarichi
 Sultan Al-Menhali
 Stanislas Oliveira
 Jirès Kembo Ekoko

References

External links 
Toulon Tournament
Toulon Tournament 2009 Schedule

 
2009
2008–09 in French football
2009 in youth association football
June 2009 sports events in France